The Aultman House, at 711 Colorado Ave. in Trinidad, Colorado, was built in 1905.  It was listed on the National Register of Historic Places in 2007.

It is a one-and-a-half-story Queen Anne-style house, one of three Queen Annes at the intersection of Colorado Ave. and Willow St. in Trinidad.

It was home of Oliver E. Aultman (1866-1953), a commercial photographer who was a 'pioneer Trinidad photographer'.

References

National Register of Historic Places in Las Animas County, Colorado
Queen Anne architecture in Colorado
Houses completed in 1905
1905 establishments in Colorado